Víctor Noriega (born Víctor Enrique Noriega Hernandez May 10, 1972) is a Mexican actor, singer and model.

Biography
Born in Mexico City, he started his career as a model. He then pursued a BA in Communications. At the same time he auditioned for a musical group and became part of Garibaldi from 1989 to 1998, in which he was one of the eight original members.

The group reunited in 1999 launching a double CD. He then started his acting career in Mexican soap operas. Later on he mixed his career as a host for several TV shows for Univision and TeleFutura. He recorded an album as solo artist, but it was never released. However he continues to pursue his dream of recording and releasing a CD as a solo artist in the near future.

Music

I. Garibaldi
The group was formed during a casting by producer Luis de Llano in 1989. It originally cast 11 members, but months later after image testing only eight participants were kept in the group: 
 Patricia Manterola, singer/model/actress
 Katia Llanos, entrepreneur in Playa del Carmen, Quintana Roo, Mexico
 Luisa Fernanda, television host for Telemundo, radio host for Univision
 Pilar Montenegro, singer/actress
 Víctor Noriega, actor/singer/model
 Sergio Mayer, actor and producer of Sólo para Mujeres
 Charly López, restaurateur
 Javier Ortiz, actor Sólo para Mujeres and Aventurera

Other members who joined the group upon replacement of the original members were:
 Ingrid Coronado, television host for TV Azteca
 Paola Toyos, actress/model
 Mara Almada, model/TV host

Discography
2010: Garibaldi Bicentenario
1999: Reunion 10
1994: Caribe
1993: Gritos De Guerra, Gritos De Amor
1993: Donde Quedo La Bolita
1991: Los Hijos De Buda
1990: Noche Buena
1990: Que Te La Pongo
1989: Garibaldi

II. Víctor Noriega (solo career)
In 2001, Víctor Noriega recorded his first solo album with Flamingo Music. However, the album was never released.

Discography
2001: Por un Beso  Recorded with Flamingo Music, however, album was never released.

Filmography

TV shows
His participation in other TV shows include:
 Big Brother VIP: Mexico, in 2002 where he was the second evicted
 El Gordo y la Flaca, he has continuously co-hosted the entertainment news show with Lili Estefan since 2002
 Teleton 20-30 Panama, he was a guest host in 2002
 Objetivo Fama, a reality show in looking for Latin talent. He was the host in 2005
 Premios TV Novelas, 2002 to date. Co-host.

Movies
His participation in movies include:
1992: Donde Quedo la Bolita  in 1992, in which all the Garibaldi members participated.

Theatre
His participation in theatre includes:
 No Puedo, in 1999 as Roberto Legorreta
 Mame El Musical, in 2014-2015
 El Padre, in 2017-2018

Notes

References
 Biography Grandesestrellas.com

External links

1972 births
Living people
Mexican male telenovela actors
Mexican emigrants to the United States
Male actors from Mexico City
Singers from Mexico City
21st-century Mexican singers
21st-century Mexican male singers